Silja Helena Känsäkoski (born 9 August 1997) is a Finnish swimmer.  She competed at the 2014 Youth Olympic Games and the 2016 FINA World Championships.

Career 
Känsäkoski competed in four events at the 2014 Youth Olympic Games.  She was set to compete in the mixed 4 × 100 metre medley relay, but the Finnish team was disqualified after the first lap. She competed in the 50-metre breaststroke and qualified to the semifinals where she finished 12th. She also finished 12th in the 200-metre breaststroke. Her best result came in the 100-metre breaststroke where she qualified to the finals, and she finished 5th.

Känsäkoski competed at the 2016 FINA World Championships in four events. First, she competed in the 50-metre breaststroke where she finished 5th in the semifinals. She qualified to the finals of the 100-metre breaststroke along with teammate Jenna Laukkanen, marking the first time two Finnish swimmers competed in the same World Championships final. She finished 6th with a time of 1:05.16. She finished 14th in the heats of the 200-metre breaststroke. She competed in the 4 × 100 metre medley relay with Laukkanen, Emilia Bottas, and Hanna-Maria Seppälä, and they finished 12th in the heats.

Känsäkoski began competing for Arizona State University in 2017. That year, she won the Pac-12 Conference Championship in the 100-metre breaststroke. She won the same event in 2019, and she finished 13th in the 100-metre breaststroke at the 2019 NCAA Championships. At the end of her senior year, she received the Bill Kajikawa Award which is an award given to a male and a female graduating student-athlete based on academic excellence, athletic accomplishment, and service in the community.

References 

1997 births
Living people
Finnish female breaststroke swimmers
Swimmers at the 2014 Summer Youth Olympics
Arizona State Sun Devils women's swimmers
Finnish expatriate sportspeople in the United States
Sportspeople from Oulu
20th-century Finnish women
21st-century Finnish women